Santos FC Ouagadougou (Santos) is a Burkinabé football club based in Ouagadougou. They play their home games at the Stade Municipal. The club colours are red and black. The club was founded on 10 April 1977. It has won the 2nd division title three times, in 1986, 1991 and 1992.

External links
Santos FC Ouagadougou logo

Football clubs in Burkina Faso
Association football clubs established in 1977
Sport in Ouagadougou
1977 establishments in Upper Volta